Adrienne Outlaw (born 1970) is an American sculptor and interdisciplinary artist. Her work draws inspiration from bioethical issues and biotechnology. Based in Tennessee, she is represented by whitespace gallery, in Atlanta, Georgia.

Her work is included in the permanent collections of the US Embassy in Abuja, Nigeria, Cheekwood Museum of Art, and the Tennessee State Museum. Outlaw's work has been featured in Art in America, Art Papers, World Sculpture, Sculpture, USArt, FiberArts, and Number: An Independent Arts Journal. Outlaw is a graduate of the School of the Art Institute of Chicago,(BFA, 1993) and Vanderbilt University, (MLAS, 2004).

References

External links

Official website
Review: Burnaway
Fecund Video Series, 2010

Living people
American women sculptors
Sculptors from Tennessee
Interdisciplinary artists
School of the Art Institute of Chicago alumni
Vanderbilt University alumni
1970 births
Date of birth missing (living people)
Place of birth missing (living people)
21st-century American women artists